John Leeper Dunlop  (10 July 1939 – 7 July 2018) was an English race horse trainer based in Arundel, Sussex. He trained the winners of 74 Group One races, including 10 British Classics, with over 3000 winners in total. He was the British flat racing Champion Trainer in 1995.

Born in Tetbury, he first took out a training licence in 1966. After a two-year apprenticeship with Neville Dent and Gordon Smyth he took over Castle Stables in Arundel, on the Duke of Norfolk's estate.

He played a pivotal role in the establishment of Middle Eastern influences in British horseracing, training Hatta, Sheikh Mohammed's first winner as an owner at Brighton in 1977. He was also associated with Sheikh Hamdan Al Maktoum over a period of three decades, training horses such as Salsabil, winner of the 1,000 Guineas, Oaks and Irish Derby. The main jockeys with which he was associated include the Australian Ron Hutchinson, Willie Carson, Pat Eddery and Lester Piggott . In later years he was also associated with Richard Quinn and Ted Durcan. The 2,000 Guineas was the only British Classic that eluded him.

Dunlop was appointed OBE in the 1996 Birthday Honours. He was also a trustee of the British Racing School.

In 2001, he suffered a ruptured aorta, but survived. He retired at the end of the 2012 flat racing season. His sons, Ed and Harry, are also both trainers. Jeremy Noseda and Gerard Butler also learnt their trade with him.

He died on 7 July 2018 at the age of 78.

Major wins

 Great Britain
 1,000 Guineas - (3) - Quick As Lightning (1980), Salsabil (1990), Shadayid (1991)
 Ascot Gold Cup - (1) - Ragstone (1974)
 Coronation Cup - (2) - Sea Chimes (1980), Silver Patriarch (1998)
 Derby - (2) - Shirley Heights (1978), Erhaab (1994)
 Dewhurst Stakes - (1) - Mujahid (1998)
 Eclipse Stakes - (1) - Scottish Rifle (1973)
 Falmouth Stakes - (1) - Tashawak (2002)
 Fillies' Mile - (2) - Quick As Lightning (1979), Aqaarid (1994)
 Haydock Sprint Cup - (4) - Runnett (1981), Habibti (1983), Lavinia Fontana (1994), Invincible Spirit (2002)
 July Cup - (2) - Habibti (1983), Elnadim (1998)
 King's Stand Stakes - (2) - Habibti (1984), Chilibang (1988)
 Lockinge Stakes - (1) - Wassl (1984 dead-heat)
 Nunthorpe Stakes - (1) - Habibti (1983)
 Oaks - (2) - Circus Plume (1984), Salsabil (1990)
 Prince of Wales's Stakes - (1) - Arthur (1971)
 Queen Anne Stakes - (1) - Lahib (1992)
 Queen Elizabeth II Stakes - (3) - Trusted (1977), Lahib (1992), Bahri (1995)
 Racing Post Trophy - (1) - Beauchamp King (1995)
 St. James's Palace Stakes - (3) - Posse (1980), Marju (1991), Bahri (1995)
 St. Leger - (3) - Moon Madness (1986), Silver Patriarch (1997), Millenary (2000)
 Sun Chariot Stakes - (1) - Talented (1993)
 Sussex Stakes - (1) - Posse (1980)
 Yorkshire Oaks - (2) - Awaasif (1982), Circus Plume (1984)

 France
 Grand Prix de Saint-Cloud - (1) - Moon Madness (1987)
 Prix de l'Abbaye de Longchamp - (1) - Habibti (1983)
 Prix du Cadran - (2) - San Sebastian (2000), Give Notice (2002)
 Prix Ganay - (1) - Golden Snake (2001)
 Prix Jean Prat - (1) - Olden Times (2001)
 Prix Marcel Boussac - (3) - Ashayer (1987), Salsabil (1989), Shadayid (1990)
 Prix Vermeille - (2) - Salsabil (1990), Leggera (1998)

 Germany
 Aral-Pokal - (1) - Almaarad (1988)
 Bayerisches Zuchtrennen - (1) - Highland Chieftain (1986)
 Preis von Europa - (3) - Taipan (1997, 1998), Golden Snake (2000)

 Ireland
 Irish 1,000 Guineas - (2) - Black Satin (1970), Mehthaaf (1994)
 Irish 2,000 Guineas - (1) - Wassl (1983)
 Irish Champion Stakes - (1) - North Stoke (1977)
 Irish Derby - (2) - Shirley Heights (1978), Salsabil (1990)
 Irish St. Leger - (1) - Mountain Lodge (1983)
 Matron Stakes - (3) - Llyn Gwynant (1988), Cloud of Dust (1992), Iftiraas (2000)
 Moyglare Stud Stakes - (1) - Habibti (1982)

 Italy
 Derby Italiano - (1) - Tommy Way (1986)
 Gran Criterium - (4) - Sanam (1986), Sikeston (1988), Alhijaz (1991), Hello (1996)
 Gran Premio del Jockey Club - (3) - Silvernesian (1992), Silver Patriarch (1998), Golden Snake (2000)
 Gran Premio di Milano - (1) - Alwuhush (1989)
 Premio Lydia Tesio - (3) - Miss Secreto (1989), Oumaldaaya (1992), Claxon (2000)
 Premio Parioli - (2) - Sikeston (1989), Alhijaz (1992)
 Premio Presidente della Repubblica - (2) - Jalmood (1983), Alwuhush (1989)
 Premio Roma - (4) - High Hawk (1983), Highland Chieftain (1989), Taipan (1997, 1998)
 Premio Vittorio di Capua - (2) - Alhijaz (1992, 1993)

References

1939 births
2018 deaths
British racehorse trainers
Officers of the Order of the British Empire
People from Tetbury
Sportspeople from Gloucestershire